Ho Yen Mei (born 29 April 1996) is a Malaysian badminton player who competes in the singles category. She won the women's singles title at the BWF Tour Super 100 2018 Russian Open. Ho was also the part of the Malaysia team to win the women's team silver at the 2015 and 2017 Southeast Asian Games.

Early life 
Ho was born on 29 April 1996 to her father, Albert Ho. When she was young, her family used to go to the Pandan Lake Club. Her mother would take her for swimming classes while her father played badminton. After swimming classes, she and her mother would wait for her father. Yen Mei then started  playing badminton with her father and his friends. A year later, she  signed up for badminton classes. She got a place at the Bukit Jalil Sports School when she was Form Three.

Ho has said that she would have become a swimmer if not for her father, and that she has no regrets taking up badminton whilst she still favours swimming.

Achievements

BWF World Tour 
The BWF World Tour, which was announced on 19 March 2017 and implemented in 2018, is a series of elite badminton tournaments sanctioned by the Badminton World Federation (BWF). The BWF World Tours are divided into levels of World Tour Finals, Super 1000, Super 750, Super 500, Super 300 (part of the HSBC World Tour), and the BWF Tour Super 100.

Women's singles

BWF International Challenge/Series 
Women's singles

  BWF International Challenge tournament
  BWF International Series tournament
  BWF Future Series tournament

National Championships

References 

1996 births
Living people
Malaysian sportspeople of Chinese descent
Sportspeople from Kuala Lumpur
Malaysian female badminton players
Competitors at the 2015 Southeast Asian Games
Competitors at the 2017 Southeast Asian Games
Southeast Asian Games silver medalists for Malaysia
Southeast Asian Games medalists in badminton
21st-century Malaysian women